The Champions Cup is floorball tournament organized by the International Floorball Federation for the best clubs from the top four countries according to IFF World Ranking. As of 2023, those are Finland, Sweden, the Czech Republic and Switzerland, both for men and women. The tournament takes place every year in January both for men's and women's teams, that won in the previous season in their national leagues. Those are Finnish F-liiga, Swedish Svenska Superligan, Czech men's Superliga florbalu and women's Extraliga žen ve florbale and Swiss Unihockey Prime League. That means, there are eight teams in the tournament in total. Since 2024, winners of national cups will also attend. The competing countries alternate in hosting the tournament. The event lasts two days.

In various formats, the tournament took place 28 times, the last time in 2023. The first tournament was played in 1993. The current format for four teams is used since 2019. Swedes won most titles, 23, in both men's and women's tournaments.

There are other tournaments organized for clubs from European countries at lower ranks: EuroFloorball Cup for countries at the fifth through tenth rank, and  EuroFloorball Challenge for the rest.

History of the tournament 
The first international club tournament was European Cup. It took place the first time in 1993. In 2008, the tournament was renamed to EuroFloorball Cup due to a naming conflict.

In 2011, the tournament was split to the Champions Cup for six teams and the EuroFloorball Cup for the rest. The Champions Cup was played by teams from the top five ranked countries. The hosting country had two teams in the tournament. In all tournaments played in this format, teams from the Czech Republic, Finland, Sweden and Switzerland competed. The sixth participant in men's tournament varied throughout the years from Germany, Latvia and Norway. In women's tournament, they were from Latvia, Norway and Russia.

The tournament was further split in 2019 to the Champions Cup for clubs from the top four countries, and EuroFloorball Cup and EuroFloorball Challenge for rest. At the same time, a tournament term was changed from October to January of the next year. For this reason, there was no tournament in 2018.

Men's tournament

Women's tournament

See also 
 IFF World Ranking
 International Floorball Federation

References

External links 
Official website

EuroFloorball Cup
International floorball competitions